Amirthanathan Adaikalanathan (born 10 June 1962), commonly known as Selvam Adaikalanathan, is a Sri Lankan Tamil militant turned politician and Member of Parliament. He was the Deputy chairman of committees of the Parliament of Sri Lanka from September 2015 to March 2020. He is the leader of the Tamil Eelam Liberation Organization, a member of the Tamil National Alliance.

Early life
Adaikalanathan was born 10 June 1962. He hails from Mannar in northern Sri Lanka. At the age of 15 he joined the Tamil Eelam Liberation Organization (TELO), a Tamil militant group fighting for an independent state of Tamil Eelam in northern and eastern Sri Lanka. He took on the nom de guerre Selvam'. Adaikalanathan took on the leadership/presidency of TELO following the killing of Sri Sabaratnam by the Liberation Tigers of Tamil Eelam on 5 May 1986.

Political career
Adaikalanathan contested the 1989 parliamentary election as a ENDLF/EPRLF/TELO/TULF electoral alliance candidate in Vanni District but failed to get elected after coming 3rd amongst the alliance candidates. He contested the 2000 parliamentary election as one of the TELO's candidates in Vanni District and was elected to the Parliament of Sri Lanka.

On 20 October 2001 the All Ceylon Tamil Congress, Eelam People's Revolutionary Liberation Front, TELO and Tamil United Liberation Front formed the Tamil National Alliance (TNA). Adaikalanathan contested the 2001 parliamentary election as one of the TNA's candidates in Vanni District and was re-elected to Parliament. He was re-elected at the 2004, 2010 and 2015 parliamentary elections. He as elected Deputy chairman of committees of the Parliament of Sri Lanka when the new parliament met on 1 September 2015.

Adaikalanathan was re-elected at the 2020 parliamentary election.

Electoral history

References

1962 births
Deputy chairmen of committees of the Parliament of Sri Lanka
Living people
Members of the 11th Parliament of Sri Lanka
Members of the 12th Parliament of Sri Lanka
Members of the 13th Parliament of Sri Lanka
Members of the 14th Parliament of Sri Lanka
Members of the 15th Parliament of Sri Lanka
Members of the 16th Parliament of Sri Lanka
People from Northern Province, Sri Lanka
Sri Lankan Roman Catholics
Sri Lankan Tamil politicians
Sri Lankan Tamil rebels
Tamil Eelam Liberation Organization militants
Tamil Eelam Liberation Organization politicians
Tamil National Alliance politicians